The Diamant rocket (French for "diamond") was the first exclusively French expendable launch system and at the same time the first satellite launcher not built by either the United States or USSR. As such, it has been referred to as being a key predecessor for all subsequent European launcher projects.

During 1962, development of the Diamant commenced as the inaugural spacecraft project of France's space agency, the Centre National d'Études Spatiales (CNES). As a project, it was derived from the military program Pierres précieuses (fr.: gemstones) that included the five prototypes Agate, Topaze, Emeraude, Rubis and Saphir (Agate, Topaz, Emerald, Ruby and Sapphire), and drew heavily upon the knowledge and technologies that had been previously developed. On 26 November 1965, the Diamant A performed its maiden flight. Out of a total of 12 launch attempts to be performed between 1965 and 1975, 9 of these were successful. Most notably, on 26 November 1965, the Diamant was used to successfully launch the first French satellite, named Astérix.

Three successive versions of the Diamant rocket were developed, designated A, B and BP4. All versions had three stages and a payload of approximately 150 kg for a 200 km orbit. Despite the success of the Diamant as a launcher, France ultimately chose to terminate further work on its national launcher program in favor of participation in the multi-European programme to produce what would become the Ariane launcher in 1975.

Development

Background
During the late 1940s and 1950s, substantial interest arose amongst the international powers of the era in the development of rocketry and missile technology, in particular the prospects for ballistic missiles capable of travelling great distances. Both of the emergent superpowers of the time, the United States and the Union of Soviet Socialist Republics (USSR) chose to invest heavily within this new field, observing its political and military importance; it was not long before a highly competitive atmosphere emerged where neither entity wished to fall behind the other in missile technology, which directly led to the so-called 'space race'. In addition, other nations also sought to make headway with this technology, often seeking to exploit and build upon knowledge which had been acquired from Nazi Germany's V2 programme. In western Europe, both the United Kingdom and France began making significant early steps in this field.

While Britain forged ahead with programmes such as the Black Knight ballistic missile demonstrator and the military-orientated Blue Steel missile programme, France also made progress on its own efforts. During 1949, the French government established the Laboratoire de Recherches Balistiques et Aérodynamiques at Vernon, outside Paris, for the purpose of pursuing its own military-focused ballistic missiles programmes. The agency initially conducted relatively straightforward and cost-conscious programmes, such as the development of the V2-based Veronique liquid-fuelled rocket in cooperation with a number of German scientists, which first flew during 1954. During 1957, having been suitably encouraged by the progress made, the Comité d'Action Scientifique de Défense Nationale (CASDN) decided to finance further refinements of the Veronique rocket.

During 1958, French wartime military leader Charles de Gaulle became President of France, establishing the Fifth Republic. De Gaulle, who was openly keen to develop a capable and fully independent French nuclear deterrent, determined that French-built missiles could comprise a potent element of the French military's fledgling nuclear arsenal, known as the Force de frappe; further impetus in favour of missile development was generated by the Sputnik crisis, a fear that other powers were falling behind the Soviet Union's progress in missile development, which had been provoked by the USSR's success with Sputnik 1, the first man-made satellite to be successfully orbited. A greatly expanded and renewed framework for missile-related development was promptly issued alongside generous government support for scientific research; specifically, the new efforts covered technologies such as intermediate-range ballistic missiles (IRBMs), submarine-launched ballistic missile, and reconnaissance satellites.

Emergence and success
During 1959, the French government established the Comité de Recherches Spatiales (CRS), which would later be renamed as the Centre National d'Études Spatiales (CNES). The newly formed CRS, initially chaired by the French physicist Pierre Auger, was tasked with the coordination of all French research efforts in the field of space. From an early stage, the organisation's primary goal was to pursue the development of an indigenous expendable launch system with which payloads, such as satellites, could be launched into orbit. The indigenous launcher, which was promptly named Diamant, drew heavily from the military ballistic missile programmes which had preceded it; as such, much of the rocket's design was based upon these early missiles.

On 26 November 1965, the first Diamant rocket was fired from its launch site, the CIEES testing range, at Hammaguir, Bechar Province, Algeria. This maiden flight was deemed to be a success, achieving sufficient altitude and launching French's first satellite, a 42 kg test vehicle known as Astérix, into orbit; this feat has been viewed as cementing France as the third space power in the world, as well as affirming its independence and strategic capabilities. During 1966 and 1967, Diamant was used to launch three French-built scientific satellites. On 9 April 1968, the Guiana Space Centre, France's new national launching complex at Kourou, French Guiana, was officially declared to be operational; Diamant launches were subsequently shifted to this facility, along with various other missiles in use by France and, later on, other European nations as well.

On 10 March 1970, the first Diamant B rocket, an improved model of the launcher, was fired, carrying a pair of scientific satellite, named DIAL/MIKA and DIAL/WIKA, into orbit. Only one of the two satellites, which had been produced as a collaborative effort between France and Germany to study the Van Allen radiation belt around the Earth, survived the launch process. Overall, the Diamant rocket came to be recognised as a successful and reliable launch vehicle, competitive amongst even the best of its international competitors throughout the world during its time.

Successor and discontinuation
While Diamant had proven to be a viable and reliable launcher, the sheer size of the American and Soviet space programmes far exceeded what would be realistically achievable not only by France but by any of the independent nations of western Europe. As this realisation became prevalent, it was also recognised that cooperative efforts between nations and a new generation of international programmes would enable these nations to play a much greater and significant role in space exploration. Early collaborative programmes, such as the European Launcher Development Organisation (ELDO) and European Space Research Organisation (ESRO), bore mixed results but showed the promise of such endeavours, thus a greater emphasis was placed upon international efforts on the topic of space.

As a consequence of Britain's withdrawal from participation in the ELDO, it was decided to replace the British-built Blue Streak, which comprised the first stage of the organisation's multinational launcher, known as Europa, with the French-built Diamant taking its place. All work on the Europa programme was terminated only a few years later due to the high failure rate encountered. Meanwhile, Britain decided to focus its efforts on the indigenous Black Arrow launcher instead.

During 1974, the European Space Agency (ESA) was founded for this purpose; the ESA effectively enabled the competing and overlapping national space programmes to be succeeded by a single organised multinational framework with work shared between the member states instead. Specifically, in 1976, work commenced on the new collaborative Ariane 1 launcher, the first version of what would become the highly successful Ariane family. The existence of the Ariane programme, a rival launcher to the earlier Diamant rocket, effectively replaced the demand for and the role of France's indigenous launcher, rendering it obsolete and redundant in comparison. France ultimately decided to discontinue further launches using Diamant in favour of the newer Ariane platform.

Variants

Diamant A 

This was the first version of the Diamant rockets, operational between 1965 and 1967. Remarkably for a newly developed system, all of the first four launches attempted launched were partly successful, the only failure occurring on the second launch when the payload was inserted into a lower orbit than planned.  It possessed a first stage of 10 m, 1.4 metres in diameter, and a weight of 14.7 metric tons. Their engines of the type LRBA Vexin supplied a thrust of 269 kN for 93 seconds. The second stage was 4.7 metres long and had a diameter of 80 centimetres. It weighed 2.9 metric tons and developed a thrust of 165 kN for a duration of 44 seconds. The third stage is 2.65 m long and weighed 709 kilograms. It burned for 45 seconds and developed a thrust of 27 kN to 53 kN. Completely installed, a Diamant A was 18.95 metres high and weighed 18.4 metric tons.

Diamant B 
An improved version of the Diamant A with a more powerful first stage. Five satellite launches were attempted between 1970 and 1973, of which the last two failed. All launches took place from Kourou in French Guiana.

Its first stage was 14.2 meters long, had a diameter of 1.4 meters and weighed 20.1 metric tons. Its engine developed a thrust of 316 kN to 400 kN (depending on flight altitude) for 116 seconds. The second stage was carried over from Diamant A without modification. The third stage was 1.67 meters long and had a diameter of 80 centimeters. It developed a thrust of 24 kN for 46 seconds. Completely assembled, a Diamant B was 23.5 meters high and weighed 24.6 metric tons.

Diamant BP4 
This version incorporated a new second stage, while carrying the first and third stages over from its predecessor. It performed three successful launches in 1975, putting a total of four satellites into orbit. Its second stage, which was derived from the MSBS rocket, was 2.28 metres long and 1.5 metres in diameter and developed a thrust of 180 kN for 55 seconds.

Launch history

See also 

 Aggregat 8
 Comparison of orbital launchers families
 French space program

References

Citations

Bibliography

 Bleeker, J.A., Johannes Geiss and M. Huber. "The Century of Space Science." Springer Science & Business Media, 2012. .
 Turner, Martin J.L. "Rocket and Spacecraft Propulsion: Principles, Practice and New Developments." Springer Science & Business Media, 2008. .

External links 
 Capcom eSpace (French language page with history on French/ESA rockets)
 Encyclopedia Astronautica (Diamant)
 Encyclopedia Astronautica (Precious Stones series of French rockets built in the 1950s-1960s)

1973 in spaceflight
Space program of France
Rockets and missiles
Space launch vehicles of France